Acanthostachys is a genus of the botanical family Bromeliaceae, subfamily Bromelioideae. The genus name is from the Greek “acanthos” (thorny, spiny) and “stachys” (a flower spike).

Species
There are three known species, all endemic to South America:

 Acanthostachys pitcairnioides (Mez) Rauh & Barthlott (distribution : Northeast Brazil)
Acanthostachys calcicola Marcusso & Lombardi (distribution : central Brazil)
 Acanthostachys strobilacea (Schultes f.) Klotzsch (distribution : Brazil, Paraguay, Argentina)

References

External links
 BSI Genera Gallery photos

Bromelioideae
Bromeliaceae genera
Flora of South America